Aporia leucodice, the Himalayan blackvein, is a mid-sized to large butterfly of the family Pieridae, that is, the yellows and whites, which is found in India.

See also
Pieridae
List of butterflies of India
List of butterflies of India (Pieridae)

References
 
 
 
 
 

Aporia (butterfly)
Butterflies described in 1843